TAI Gözcü is a radio-controlled short-range tactical drone. Designed, developed and built by Turkish Aerospace Industries (TAI), the unmanned aerial vehicle (UAV) is in use by the Turkish Armed Forces for intelligence, surveillance, target acquisition and reconnaissance purposes. Gözcü is the Turkish word for observer.

Overview
Built of composite material, the drone is launched from a catapult, and is recovered by parachute. It has waypoint navigation and autonomous flight capabilities.

Its endurance is over 120 minutes.

Development
The maiden flight of the drone took place on March 6, 2007. The first flight with camera was on April 4, 2007. The prototype of TAI Gözcü was presented to public at the International Defence Industry Fair IDEF in Mai 2007, and took part in the Victory Day parade end August the same year. The following flight tests in September 2007 showed that the UAV was in the beginning unable to monitor the vehicles in the terrain, over them it was flying, because it was too fast. Unlike the target drones the surveillance drones must fly slower, the TAI officials admitted. In 2011, it was reported that the flight tests were successfully completed.

TAI Gözcü is intended to serve nonstop for intelligence, surveillance and reconnaissance in military operations against infiltration and activities of terrorists in southeastern Turkey.

Specifications

See also
 Bayraktar Mini UAV
 Bayraktar TB2
 Bayraktar Akıncı
 Bayraktar Tactical UAS
 TAI Anka
 TAI Aksungur

References

External links
 Images of TAI Gözcü at Facebook
 İmage of TAI Gözcü at Turk Military

Unmanned military aircraft of Turkey
Gozcu
Turkish military reconnaissance aircraft
Single-engined pusher aircraft
Delta-wing aircraft
V-tail aircraft
2000s Turkish military aircraft